The Columbellidae, the dove snails or dove shells, are a family of minute to small sea snails, marine gastropod mollusks in the order Neogastropoda.

Distribution
Species in this family are found worldwide, but are most abundant in shallow tropical water.

Subfamilies 
According to the taxonomy of the Gastropoda by Bouchet & Rocroi (2005), the family Columbellidae consists of two subfamilies:
 Columbellinae Swainson, 1840
 Atiliinae Cossmann, 1901 - synonyms: Pyrenidae Suter, 1909; Anachidae Golikov & Starobogatov, 1972
 Columbellidae incertae sedis (temporary name)
 Columbellidae incertae sedis mariato (Pilsbry & H. N. Lowe, 1932)

Genera
The family Columbellidae contains these genera:
subfamily Columbellinae
 Columbella Lamarck, 1799 - type genus

subfamily Atiliinae
 Anachis H. Adams & A. Adams, 1853
 Atilia H. Adams & A. Adams, 1853 - type genus of the subfamily Atiliinae
 Pyrene Röding, 1798

subfamily ?
 Aesopus Gould, 1860
 Aoteatilia Powell, 1939 
 Alcira H. Adams, 1861
 Alia H. Adams & A. Adams, 1853
 Amphissa H. Adams & A. Adams, 1853
 Antimitrella Powell, 1937
 Antizafra Finlay, 1926
 Aoteatilia Powell, 1939
 Ascalista Drivas & Jay, 1990
 Astyris H. Adams and A. Adams, 1853
 Bathyglypta Pelorce, 2017
 Bifurcium P. Fischer, 1884
 Cilara Thiele, 1924
 Clathranachis Kuroda & Habe, 1954
 Clavistrombina Jung, 1989
 Columbellopsis Bucquoy, Dautzenberg and Dollfus, 1882
 Conella Swainson, 1840
 Cosmioconcha Dall, 1913
 Costoanachis Sacco, 1890
 Cotonopsis Olsson, 1942
 Decipifus Olsson and McGinty, 1958
 Euplica Dall, 1889
 Euspiralta K. Monsecour & Pelorce, 2013
 Exomilopsis Powell, 1964
 Falsuszafrona Pelorce, 2020
 Gatliffena Iredale, 1929
 Glyptanachis Pilsbry & Lowe, 1932
 Graphicomassa Iredale, 1929
 Indomitrella Oostingh, 1940
 Liratilia Finlay, 1927
 Macrozafra Finlay, 1927
 Mazatlania Dall, 1913
 Metanachis Thiele, 1924
 Metulella Gabb, 1873
 Microcithara P. Fischer, 1884
 Minimanachis Pelorce, 2020
 Minipyrene Coomans, 1967
 Mitrella Risso, 1826
 Mitropsis Pease, 1868
 Mokumea Habe, 1991
 Nassarina Dall, 1889
 Nitidella Swainson, 1840
 Nodochila Rehder, 1980
 Parametaria Dall, 1916
 Pardalinops De Maintenon, 2008
 Parvanachis Radwin, 1968
 Parviterebra Pilsbry, 1904
 Paxula Finlay, 1927
 Pictocolumbella Habe, 1945
 Pleurifera Drivas & Jay, 1997
 Psarostola Rehder, 1943
 Pseudamycla Pace, 1902
 Pseudanachis Thiele, 1924
 Pyreneola Iredale, 1918
 Retizafra Hedley, 1913
 Rhombinella Radwin, 1968
 Ruthia Shasky, 1970
 Salitra Marincovich, 1973
 Seminella  Pease, 1867 
 Sincola Olsson & Harbison, 1953
 Steironepion Pilsbry and Lowe, 1932
 Strombina Mörch, 1852
 Sulcomitrella Kuroda, Habe & Oyama, 1971
 Suturoglypta Radwin, 1968
 Zafra A. Adams, 1860
 Zafrona Iredale, 1916
 Zella Iredale, 1924
 Zemitrella Finlay, 1927

References

External links 
 Miocene Gastropods and Biostratigraphy of the Kern River Area, California; United States Geological Survey Professional Paper 642 
 Russini V., Fassio G., Modica M. V., deMaintenon M. J. & Oliverio M. 2017. An assessment of the genus Columbella Lamarck, 1799 (Gastropoda: Columbellidae) from eastern Atlantic. Zoosystema 39 (2): 197-212